Shaun Squires (born 20 March 1990) is a professional rugby league footballer who plays as a second row and centre for the Dewsbury Rams in the Kingstone Press Championship. 

Squires has previously played for the Batley Bulldogs and the Sheffield Eagles in the Championship.

References

External links
Sheffield Eagles profile

1990 births
Living people
Rugby league second-rows
Sheffield Eagles players
Batley Bulldogs players